Yvonne Pearce Mazzulo is an American journalist, activist, and author.

Biography
Yvonne Pearce Mazzulo was born in Philadelphia, Pennsylvania. Mazzulo's maternal grandfather was Austin Gunsel, NFL treasurer, commissioner, and former FBI agent.

Mazzulo attended Delaware County, Pennsylvania public schools and the now defunct private preparatory secondary school, Swarthmore Academy.

Mazzulo spent the beginning of her career in the automotive industry. Upon the death of a brother, Mazzulo founded, in 1986 a nonprofit and at the time, was among the youngest persons in the United States to run an organization of this type. Mazzulo served as trustee and executive director, 1986–99.

Mazzulo works as a freelance journalist and is an advocate for Juvenile Justice Reform in the United States.

Sources
The Philadelphia Inquirer, June 7, 1995
Daily Local News, February 17, 1994
The Village Voice, May 31, 1995

External links
 Contributions

Living people
Writers from Philadelphia
American women journalists
Journalists from Pennsylvania
Year of birth missing (living people)
21st-century American women